Pseudoxanthomonas japonensis is a species of mesophilic, motile, strictly aerobic, Gram-negative, non-spore-forming, rod-shaped bacteria with one polar flagellum, first isolated from human urine, riverside urban soil and anaerobic digester. 12-3T (=CCUG 48231T =CIP 107388T =JCM 11525T) is the type strain.

References

Further reading
Whitman, William B., et al., eds. Bergey's manual® of systematic bacteriology. Vol. 3. Springer, 2012.
DK, Maheshwari. Industrial Exploitation of Microorganisms. IK International Pvt Ltd, 2010.

External links

LPSN
Type strain of Pseudoxanthomonas japonensis at BacDive -  the Bacterial Diversity Metadatabase

Xanthomonadales
Gram-negative bacteria
Bacteria described in 2004